Jerry Hudson is a former Canadian ice hockey player.  He played several seasons with clubs in the United Kingdom and Italy, and a season both in the Netherlands, and Austria during the 1950s and 60s.

Born in Gananoque, Ontario, Hudson played in Scotland, first two (or three) seasons Dunfermline Vikings, where in 1950-1 and 1952-3 he was named Scottish League All-Star B Team member. The following two seasons he spent with Falkirk Lions.  In 1955 he joined Nottingham Panthers, staying for two seasons.

Hudson joined Serie A club HC Bolzano in 1957.  Where he played (if he played) between 1960 and '64 is not documented.  For the 1964-5 season he played for Dutch side Den Haag Wolves.  For 1966-7 he played for Austrian club Wiener EV before rejoining Bolzano, where he stayed to the end of the following season.  He spent 1969-70 with A.S. Asiago, also in Italy.

Sources

Asiago Hockey 1935 players
Bolzano HC players
British National League (1954–1960) players
Canadian ice hockey forwards
Den Haag Wolves players
Eredivisie (ice hockey) players
Ice hockey people from Ontario
Nottingham Panthers players
People from Leeds and Grenville United Counties
Scottish National League (1932–1954) players
Wiener EV players
Year of birth missing
Possibly living people
Canadian expatriate ice hockey players in England
Canadian expatriate ice hockey players in the Netherlands
Canadian expatriate ice hockey players in Austria
Canadian expatriate ice hockey players in Italy
Canadian expatriate ice hockey players in Scotland
Canadian expatriate ice hockey players in the United States